Hans Karl Walter von Greyerz (7. February 1870 in Bern – 22. September 1949 in Bern) was a Swiss Reformed pastor, Christian socialist, and hymn writer.

Family 
Karl von Gruyerz was the great-grandson of the naturalist Georg Forster through his daughter Claire von Greyerz, son of the pastor Otto Wilhelm Aimé von Greyerz (1829–1882) and his wife Pauline Luise Locher (1838–1873). The writer  was his brother.

Life 
After the First World War he advocated for Christian pacifism and the introduction of alternative civilian service.

Karl von Gruyerz created a pacifist version of the hymn "Holy God, We Praise Thy Name", which is number 518 in the hymn book of the Evangelical Reformed Churches in German-speaking Switzerland and number 729 in the prayer and hymn book of the Christian Catholic Church in Switzerland.

Published works 

 
 
 "Greyerz, Hans Karl Walter von". In: Deutsche Biographische Enzyklopädie. 2. Ausgabe. Bd. 4 (2006), S. 135 (online).

External links 

 

1870 births
1949 deaths
19th-century Calvinist and Reformed ministers
20th-century Calvinist and Reformed ministers
20th-century Swiss writers
Calvinist and Reformed Christian socialists
Calvinist pacifists
Christian hymnwriters
German-language writers
Swiss Christian pacifists
Swiss Christian socialists